Madan Bhaiya, born Madan Singh Kasana, is an Indian politician. Bhaiya is a fifth-term member of the Uttar Pradesh Legislative Assembly (1991–1993, 1993–1996, 2002–2007, 2007–2012, 2022-present) and currently represents the Khatauli Assembly constituency. Madan Bhaiya has an image of Robin Hood in his area and is often referred to as Bahubali or Bhaiya Ji Madan, In the past, Bhaiya has been linked with gang violence and as of 2013 had over half a dozen alleged murder charges. He often travels in a bulletproof car along with 2-3 pilot cars having his security detail. Bhaiya has previously served four times as a MLA for Khekada Assembly constituency.

Early life 
Madan Bhaiya was born to Bhuleram Kasana, a lawyer and patwari by profession and Hoshyari Devi, on 11 September 1959, in Jawli, Ghaziabad, Uttar Pradesh. His village is amongst the biggest villages near Loni Ghaziabad. There is a majority Gurjar population in Jawli.

He was born in an affluent family and is the only son of his parents. He was notorious among locals for being involved in fights as a youth and was very active in student politics when he entered college, He dropped out of the college after completing first year as he was already suspended 9 times in a single year either for fighting or openly threatening the college staffers and teachers.

In college, due to his notorious behavior and fearless personality he had his senior students and even the teachers started to refer to him as "Bhaiya" or "Bhaiya Ji" and "Madan Bhaiya" instead of his erstwhile legal name, which is "Madan Singh Kasana". This stuck, and during 1989 Uttar Pradesh Legislative Assembly Elections when he for the first time unsuccessfully contested from Khekada Assembly Constituency while being in jail he contested as "Madan Bhaiya", for which he had to furnish an Affidavit of name change before filing his nomination as a candidate for the same election.

Controversies 

 Due to safety concerns Bhaiya travels in a bulletproof car and in 2008 sought permission for the same from the Election Commission of India which was granted to him as per point 5 of Para 10.5.1 of manual of the Model Code of Conduct "Where security requirement of a person, as assessed by security agencies, requires him/her to travel in bullet proof vehicle. Only one such vehicle may be provided by the government on payment of cost of propulsion of such vehicle by such person. No other political leader or worker, except his/her personal security officer and medical attendant, is allowed to travel in the vehicle". Later in 2010, a controversy erupted when Bhaiya ordered a bulletproof Mitsubishi Pajero SUV for himself for a sum of ₹40,00,000 from a Government Certified Agency in Gurgaon, and did not seek permission from Uttar Pradesh Police officials, rather had the superior permission from the Election Commission of India, however the car was eventually delivered to Bhaiya.
 Madan Bhaiya had openly confronted D. P. Yadav and got into a scuffle with him in Vidhan Bhavan, Lucknow in presence of hundreds of other Legislators after the latter was accused of murdering the then Dadri Assembly constituency MLA and Yadav's Political guru Mahendra Singh Bhati in September, 1992. Then the Chief Minister of Uttar Pradesh Mulayam Singh Yadav personally had to get involved in the matter as DP Yadav was associated with the newly formed Samajwadi Party at that time. After his name came in Bhati’s murder, Gurjars of the entire state got angry with CM Mulayam Singh Yadav then CM tried to pacify the Gurjars through the then SP State President Ramsharan Das, But he did not get any success. Then CM had promoted Madan Bhaiya, the MLA of Khekra and had distanced himself from D. P. Yadav. CM Mulayam Singh Yadav personally visited Madan Bhaiya at his residence in Jawli Vilage of Ghaziabad. After this, there was a conflict between Madan Bhaiya and D. P. Yadav, which always remained a topic of discussion in political circles. It is said that then Madan Bhaiya had done the work of cultivating the Gurjar Community.

Personal life 
Madan Bhaiya lives in a heavily guarded farmhouse in his native village of Sharfuddinpur, Jawli, Ghaziabad with his family. He is married to Geeta Kasana and has a son and two daughters.

Political career 
Madan Bhaiya unsuccessfully contested the assembly election from Khekada Constituency for the first time in 1989 as an independent candidate while being in jail. Despite being a newcomer and being unable to campaign for himself due to being in Jail, he stood second with 33,471 votes as an independent candidate but eventually lost by a margin of just 2477 Votes to 2-term MLA Richhpal Singh Baisla, who won with 35,948 votes. 

He was first elected as a Member of the Legislative Assembly from the Khekada assembly constituency in the year 1991, while being in sitapur jail. Afterwards, Madan Bhaiya was escorted in a police bus along with a security motorcade of 20 police vehicles and 103 Uttar Pradesh Police personnel from Sitapur Jail to Vidhan Bhawan, Lucknow for the Oath taking ceremony as a Legislator. Around 2000 to 3000 of his supporters surrounded the police convoy when it was leaving the Sitapur Jail premises and due to which his convoy was not able to move for more than half an hour, it led to a highly tense situation, extra police personnel were prepared to disperse the crowds and lathi charge, but upon sensing the delicate situation the then jailer of the Sitapur Jail Mr. KP Singh Kairon personally came to Madan Bhaiya inside the police bus and requested him to ask his supporters to disperse peacefully and let the convoy pass, which he did. Afterwards, Bhaiya travelled to Lucknow and took oath as a first time MLA. 

Four months after an unsuccessful bid to murder him at his farmhouse in September, 2001 he again contested as an Independent Candidate from the Khekada Assembly constituency during the 2002 Uttar Pradesh Legislative Assembly elections. Due to immense sympathy and popularity among the masses he again won the election defeating many heavyweights with record margin of votes.

Khekada was the biggest assembly constituency of the state of Uttar Pradesh and North India until 2008, when a delimitation exercise led to boundary changes and creation of two new constituencies of Sahibabad and Loni. Both of these constituencies share their borders with Delhi, and the remaining area of the Khekada Assembly constituency was merged with the Baghpat Assembly constituency, Muradnagar Assembly constituency and Baraut Assembly constituency.

Bhaiya lost to the Bahujan Samaj Party candidate after he contested for the first time from the Loni Assembly constituency of Ghaziabad in 2012. In the 2017 elections, he lost to the Bharatiya Janata Party candidate Nand Kishor Gurjar, and in the 2022 Assembly Elections from Loni Assembly constituency he garnered 1,18,734 votes but eventually lost with a narrow margin of just 8676 votes to Nand Kishor Gurjar.

Madan Bhaiya won for the fifth time as a MLA in the 2022 by-election of Khatauli Assembly constituency which was necessitated after the disqualification of the incumbent MLA Vikram Singh Saini after him being found guilty of charges in a case related to the 2013 Muzaffarnagar riots. Madan Bhaiya defeated Bharatiya Janata Party candidate Rajkumari Saini the wife of Vikram Singh Saini with a margin of over 22,000 votes.

Attack on life 

There had been several failed attempts to murder Madan Bhaiya. In September 2001, a plot to murder him at his home was foiled by his personal security guards, as four assailants entered his farmhouse in his native Jawli Village and tried to murder him by shooting at him in the public meeting area inside his farmhouse. All four of them ran away after they saw Bhaiya was unhurt, and his security guards who had AK-47 automatic rifles to protect Madan Bhaiya, could open fire at the four assailants any moment. Later when the villagers and people nearby heard the gunshots and saw the four men fleeing the spot, they chased them and killed all four of them by beating them with bare hands and sticks.

His supporters supposedly sliced the dead bodies of assailants into two parts with sharp objects. On that very day not a single household in Jawli Village had lit their Chulahs, as a mark of respect and love towards Bhaiya. All the shops and marketplaces in the area were shut that day, as rumors had floated that 'The Tiger' had been murdered and there could be riots in the area, as the supporters of Madan Bhaiya started marching on the roads and shouting slogans like 'Aag laga denge, Laashein biccha denge, Mehekma hila denge Bhaiya Teri khaatir' . To bring back normalcy and calm the extremely heated situation, the then Chief Minister of Uttar Pradesh Rajnath Singh had telephoned Madan Bhaiya and requested him to make a public appearance and ask his supporters to not believe the rumors of his death and let there be peace. For this operation the entire police department of the region was tasked, DM and SSP of Ghaziabad were stationed at the farmhouse of Madan Bhaiya for 3 days with a team of 70 armed police personnel along with 11 sophistically trained men from the Uttar Pradesh Anti-Terrorism Squad.

One of the assailants was identified as the son of his former gurga (aide), the late Siria Pehalwan, a history Sheeter and a resident of Gokal Pur, Delhi who had been accused of involvement in the kidnapping of renowned industrialist Swatantra Rastogi from New Delhi for a ransom of ₹5 Crore on 11th of July, 1999. Siria Pehelwan was gunned down in an encounter by the Delhi Police in the same matter on 24th of July, 1999 while he was trying to escape from the police in his Maruti Esteem car from the parking of the Ashok Hotel in Chanakyapuri, New Delhi

On the same day, the brother of Siria Pehalwan lodged a police complaint in the Gokulpur Police Station of North East Delhi, accusing Madan Bhaiya and three others of kidnapping his nephew and the other three deceased persons from Gokalpur and later murdering them in Jawli, Ghaziabad. This case is still subjudice. In 2003, a warrant for Bhaiya's arrest was issued after he failed to answer bail.

Other work 

 Madan Bhaiya ran an independent organisation named 'Azad Sena' to represent and work for the people of Gurjar and Jaat caste.
 Madan Bhaiya also celebrates International Gurjar Day on 22 March of every year with thousands of his followers and supporters by organising a rally in his native area.

Madan Bhaiya himself belongs to the Gurjar Community but is also very popular among the Jaat Community of Baghpat, Meerut, Muzzafarnagar, Shamli and nearby Districts due to his longstanding association with the People of Jaat Community. During the height of his Gangster days, his gang had more Jaat members than any other caste as he trusted them with his life.

Madan Bhaiya is also an avid follower of Maharishi Valmiki and every year during Valmiki Jayanti he organises several programs in his area to make people aware of the contributions of Maharishi Valmiki to Sanātana Dharma and eradicate the practice of Untouchability from society.

References 

Living people
20th-century Indian politicians
21st-century Indian politicians
1959 births
Uttar Pradesh politicians
People from Ghaziabad, Uttar Pradesh
Rashtriya Lok Dal politicians
Janata Dal politicians
Samajwadi Party politicians
Uttar Pradesh MLAs 2022–2027